Fuentes del Valle is the third-largest colonia in Tultitlán Municipality in Mexico State, Mexico. The neighborhood is part of the Mexico City metropolitan area and had a 2010 census population of 74,087 inhabitants. It lies near the northern tip of the Federal District (Distrito Federal), and between the larger Buenavista and San Pablo de las Salinas.

References
2010 census tables: INEGI: Instituto Nacional de Estadística, Geografía e Informática

External links
Ayuntamiento de Tultitlán Official website of the Municipality of Tultitlán

Populated places in the State of Mexico
Tultitlán